Blackmore River Conservation Reserve is a protected area in the Northern Territory of Australia.

The threatened plant species, Cycas armstrongii is found within the reserve. Other species found in the area include Grevillea longicuspis and the orchid Dendrobium dicuphum.

See also
Protected areas of the Northern Territory

References

Conservation reserves in the Northern Territory
1984 establishments in Australia